Interim housing is temporary housing in Hong Kong for those not eligible for a flat in a public housing estate, but affected by disaster, fire, and redevelopment. It replaced Temporary Housing Area with buildings that are more resilient and space saving. Some of them reuse old blocks in public housing estates; others use pre-fabricated building components.

Location
All interim housing is in the New Territories:
Po Tin Interim Housing, Tuen Mun
Sai Kung Interim Housing, Sai Kung (demolished in 2007)
Long Bin Interim Housing, Yuen Long (demolished between 2016 and 2017 for development of public estates)
Kwai Shing Interim Housing, Kwai Chung (demolished in 2010)
Shek Lei Interim Housing, Kwai Chung

See also

 Public housing in Hong Kong

Public housing in Hong Kong